Greece competed at the 2019 World Aquatics Championships in Gwangju, South Korea from 12 to 28 July.

Medalists

Artistic swimming

Greece's artistic swimming team consisted of 12 athletes (12 female).

Women

 Legend: (R) = Reserve Athlete

Diving

Greek divers qualified for the individual spots at the World Championships.

Men

Open water swimming

Greece qualified one male and one female open water swimmers.

Men

Women

Swimming

Greek swimmers have achieved qualifying standards in the following events (up to a maximum of 2 swimmers in each event at the A-standard entry time, and 1 at the B-standard):

Men

Women

Water polo

Greece qualified both a men's and women's teams.

Men's tournament

Team roster

Emmanouil Zerdevas
Konstantinos Galanidis
Dimitrios Skoumpakis
Konstantinos Genidounias
Marios Kapotsis
Ioannis Fountoulis (C)
Georgios Dervisis
Alexandros Papanastasiou
Stylianos Argyropoulos
Konstantinos Mourikis
Christodoulos Kolomvos
Alexandros Gounas
Angelos Vlachopoulos
Coach: Theodoros Vlachos

Group A

Playoffs

Quarterfinals

5th–8th place semifinals

Seventh place game

Women's tournament

Team roster

Ioanna Stamatopoulou
Marina Kotsioni
Christina Tsoukala
Ioanna Chydirioti
Nikoleta Eleftheriadou
Christina Kotsia
Alkisti Avramidou
Alexandra Asimaki (C)
Maria Patra
Alkistis Benekou
Eirini Ninou
Eleftheria Plevritou
Eleni Xenaki
Coach: Georgios Morfesis

Group C

Playoffs

Quarterfinals

5th–8th place semifinals

Seventh place game

References

World Aquatics Championships
2019
Nations at the 2019 World Aquatics Championships